Langar is a village in Fergana Region, Uzbekistan. It is the administrative center of Qoʻshtepa District.

References

Populated places in Fergana Region